Anglican liturgy usually refers to liturgies according the Book of Common Prayer and its derivatives. It may also refer to the following liturgies and liturgical books used by churches and groups in the Anglican Christian tradition:

Liturgies
The liturgy of the Anglican Communion
Daily Office (Anglican), the canonical hours within Anglican practice
Compline, night prayer used by some Anglicans
Evensong, form of Vespers with singing often used by Anglicans
Prayer During the Day, form of midday prayers introduced in the Church of England's Common Worship
Holy Communion, often also known as Mass, Holy Eucharist, or the Lord's Supper. Primary Eucharistic liturgy within Anglicanism
The Holy Eucharist: Rite Two, version of the Holy Communion celebrated by the General Synod of Hong Kong Sheng Kung Hui
Anglican Use, liturgical use based on Anglican tradition as used within the Catholic Church, particularly the personal ordinariates

Liturgical books
Alternative Service Book, 1980 transitional liturgical book of the Church of England
Anglican Missal, an Anglo-Catholic missal
Anglican Breviary, an Anglo-Catholic breviary
Anglican Service Book, traditional-language revision to the 1979 prayer book
Book of Alternative Services, a current authorized liturgical book of the Anglican Church of Canada
Book of Common Prayer, standard Anglican liturgical book with multiple variations and local revisions
Book of Common Prayer (1549), first edition of the Book of Common Prayer
Book of Common Prayer (1552), first major revision of the Book of Common Prayer
Book of Common Prayer (1604), revision of the Book of Common Prayer under James I
Book of Common Prayer (1662), a current authorized liturgical book within the Church of England and other Anglican groups
Book of Common Prayer (1928), a proposed Church of England revision of the 1662 prayer book
Book of Common Prayer (1929), also known as the 1929 Scottish Prayer Book, a current authorized liturgical book of the Scottish Episcopal Church
Book of Common Prayer (1962), a current authorized liturgical book within the Anglican Church of Canada
Book of Common Prayer (1979), a current authorized liturgical book within the US-based Episcopal Church
Book of Common Prayer (1984), a current authorized liturgical book within the Church in Wales
Book of Divine Worship, formerly authorized Anglican Use liturgical book within the Catholic Church
Common Worship, a series of current authorized liturgical books within the Church of England
Divine Worship: Daily Office, a series of authorized Anglican Use liturgical books within the Catholic Church
Divine Worship: The Missal, a current authorized Anglican Use liturgical book within the Catholic Church
Edwardine Ordinals, the first two ordinals authorized by the Church of England

Related disambiguations
Book of Common Prayer (disambiguation)